Pine/Cross Dover is the sixth studio album by American rock band Masters of Reality. It was released in 2009. The album consists of two halves; tracks 1–5 make up "Pine", and tracks 6–11 make up "Cross Dover".

Track listing 
All songs by Chris Goss, except where noted.
"King Richard TLH" (Goss, Catching) - 4:20
"Absinthe Jim and Me"  - 3:03
"Worm in the Silk" (Goss, Leamy)- 4:24
"Always" (Goss, Leamy)- 3:24
"Johnny's Dream" (Goss, Leamy) - 4:38
"Up in It" - 3:44
"Dreamtime Stomp" - 4:00
"Rosie's Presence" - 3:13
"The Whore of New Orleans" (Goss, Leamy) - 4:43
"Testify to Love" (Goss, Lavelle, Clements, Griffith, Sheppard) - 4:17
"Alfalfa" (Goss, Leamy, Christian, McNichol) - 12:08

Credits 
Chris Goss - vocals, guitars, bass, keyboards
John Leamy - drums, keyboards, guitars

Additional personnel 
Dave Catching - additional guitars - ("Absinthe Jim and Me", "Worm in the Silk", "Johnny's Dream", "Up in It", "Dreamtime Stomp" and "Rosie's Presence")
Brian O'Connor - bass - ("King Richard TLH", "Absinthe Jim And Me", "Johnny's Dream" and "Rosie's Presence")
Mark Christian - guitar - ("The Whore of New Orleans" and "Alfalfa")
Brendon McNichol  - bass - ("Alfalfa")
Mike Lowry - drums - ("Testify to Love")
Pablo Clements - additional engineering - ("Testify to Love")

References

 

Masters of Reality albums
2009 albums
Albums produced by Chris Goss